The 1998 Preakness Stakes was the 123rd running of the Preakness Stakes thoroughbred horse race. The race took place on May 16, 1998, and was televised in the United States on the ABC television network. Real Quiet, who was jockeyed by Kent Desormeaux, won the race by two and one quarter lengths over runner-up Victory Gallop.  Approximate post time was 5:29 p.m. Eastern Time. The race was run over a fast track in a final time of 1:54-3/5.  The Maryland Jockey Club reported total attendance of 103,269, this is recorded as second highest on the list of American thoroughbred racing top attended events for North America in 1998.

Payout 

The 123th Preakness Stakes Payout Schedule

 $2 Exacta: (11–10) paid $14.80
 $2 Trifecta: (11–10–3) paid $97.40
 $1 Superfecta: (11–10–3–8) paid $270.80

The full chart 

 Winning Breeder: Little Hill Farm; (KY) 
 Final Time: 1:54 3/5
 Track Condition: Fast
 Total Attendance: 103,269

See also 

 1998 Kentucky Derby

References

External links 

 

1998
1998 in horse racing
1998 in American sports
1998 in sports in Maryland
Horse races in Maryland